Fascist Italy did not initially have comprehensive racist policies unlike its World War II Axis partner Nazi Germany. Italy's National Fascist Party leader, Benito Mussolini, expressed different views on the subject of race over the course of his career. By 1938, Mussolini began to actively support racist policies in the Italian Fascist regime, as evidenced by his endorsement of the "Manifesto of Race", the seventh point of which stated that "it is time that Italians proclaim themselves to be openly racist", although Mussolini said that the Manifesto was endorsed "entirely for political reasons", in deference to Nazi German wishes. After 1938, discrimination and persecution intensified and became an increasingly important hallmark of Italian Fascist ideology and policies. Nevertheless, Mussolini and the Italian military did not consistently apply the laws adopted in the Manifesto of Race. In 1943, Mussolini expressed regret for the endorsement, saying that it could've been avoided. After the Second Italo-Ethiopian War, the Italian Fascist government implemented strict racial segregation between white people and black people in Ethiopia.

Slavs

In the 1920s, Italian Fascists targeted Yugoslavs, especially Croats and Slovenes. They accused Croats of having "atavistic impulses" and they claimed that the Yugoslavs were conspiring together on behalf of "Grand Orient masonry and its funds". One anti-Semitic claim was that Croats were part of a "social-democratic, masonic Jewish internationalist plot".

Benito Mussolini considered the Slavic race inferior and barbaric. He identified the Yugoslavs (Croats) as a threat to Italy and viewed them as competitors over the region of Dalmatia, which was claimed by Italy, and claimed that the threat rallied Italians together at the end of World War I: "The danger of seeing the Jugo-Slavians settle along the whole Adriatic shore had caused a bringing together in Rome of the cream of our unhappy regions. Students, professors, workmen, citizens—representative men—were entreating the ministers and the professional politicians".

In September 1920, Benito Mussolini stated: 

As noted by the Minister of Foreign Affairs in Mussolini's government, Galeazzo Ciano, when describing a meeting with the secretary general of the Fascist party who wanted an Italian army to kill all Slovenes: 

The Province of Ljubljana saw the deportation of 25,000 people, which equaled 7.5% of its total population. The operation, one of the most drastic in Europe, filled up Italian concentration camps on the island of Rab, in Gonars, Monigo (Treviso), Renicci d'Anghiari, Chiesanuova, as well as other concentration camps that were located elsewhere.

Mario Roatta's "Circular 3C" (Circolare 3C), tantamount to a declaration of war on the Slovene civilian population, involved him in war crimes while he was the commander of the 2nd Army in the Province of Ljubljana.

In 1942, the Italians put the barbed wire fence (which is now the Trail of Remembrance and Comradeship) around Ljubljana in order to prevent communication between the Liberation Front in the city and the partisans in the surrounding countryside.

On 25 February 1942, only two days after the Italian Fascist regime established the Gonars concentration camp the first transport of 5,343 internees (1,643 of whom were children) arrived at the Rab concentration camp which was already overpopulated at the time, from the Province of Ljubljana itself as well as another Italian concentration camp in Monigo (near Treviso).

The Italian violence against the Slovene civilian population easily matched the German violence against Serbs, with frequent summary executions of Slovenes committed on the orders of Mussolini and other Fascist officials. For every major military operation, General M. Roatta issued additional special instructions, including one that the orders must be "carried out most energetically and without any false compassion".

One of Roatta's soldiers wrote home on 1 July 1942: "We have destroyed everything from top to bottom without sparing the innocent. We kill entire families every night, beating them to death or shooting them."

After the war Roatta was on a list of the most wanted Italian war criminals who were indicted by Yugoslavia and other countries, but Italy never saw anything like the Nuremberg trials because at the beginning of the Cold War, the British government believed that Pietro Badoglio, who was also on the list, would guarantee the existence of an anti-communist post-war Italy.

Jews and Africans
In a 1919 speech denouncing Soviet Russia, Mussolini claimed that "Jewish bankers" in London and New York City were bound by the chains of race to Moscow and that 80% of the Soviet leaders were Jews, endorsing the Jewish Bolshevism canard:

If Petrograd does not fall, if Denikin marks the way, it is that this is what the great Jewish bankers of London and New York want, tied by race ties with the Jews who in Moscow as in Budapest take revenge against the Aryan race who it has been condemned to dispersion for many centuries. In Russia, there are eighty percent of Soviet leaders who are Jewish. Wouldn't Bolshevism by chance be Judaism's revenge against Christianity? The topic lends itself to meditation. It is possible that Bolshevism will drown in the blood of a pogroom of catastrophic proportions. World finance is in the hands of the Jews.

Mussolini continued: 

Bolshevism is defended by international plutocracy. This is the essential truth. The Jewish-dominated and controlled international plutocracy has a supreme interest in that all Russian life accelerates its process of molecular disintegration to paroxysm.

At the 1934 Fascist International Congress, the issue of anti-Semitism was debated amongst various Fascist parties, with some being more favourable to it, and others being less favourable. Two final compromises were adopted, resulting in the official stance of the Fascist International:

[T]he Jewish question cannot be converted into a universal campaign of hatred against the Jews [...] Considering that in many places certain groups of Jews are installed in conquered countries, exercising in an open and occult manner an influence injurious to the material and moral interests of the country which harbors them, constituting a sort of state within a state, profiting by all benefits and refusing all duties, considering that they have furnished and are inclined to furnish, elements conducive to international revolution which would be destructive to the idea of patriotism and Christian civilization, the Conference denounces the nefarious action of these elements and is ready to combat them.

The "Manifesto of Race", which was published on 14 July 1938, paved the way for the enactment of the Racial Laws. The Racial Laws were promulgated on 18 November 1938, excluding Italian Jews from the civil service, the armed forces, and the National Fascist Party, and restricting Jewish ownership of certain companies and property; intermarriage was also prohibited. The first and most important of the Racial Laws (Leggi Razziali) was the Regio Decreto 17 Novembre 1938, Nr. 1728. It restricted the civil rights of Italian Jews, banned books written by Jewish authors, and excluded Jews from public offices and higher education. Additional laws stripped Jews of their assets, restricted travel, and finally, provided for their confinement in internal exile, as was done for political prisoners. In recognition of both their past and future contributions and for their service as subjects of the Italian Empire, Rome passed a decree in 1937 distinguishing the Eritreans and Ethiopians from other subjects of the newly-founded colonial empire. In the Kingdom of Italy, Eritreans and Ethiopians were to be addressed as "Africans" and not as natives, as was the case with the other African peoples subjected to the colonial rule of the Italian Empire.

The promulgation of the Racial Laws was preceded by a long press campaign and publication of the "Manifesto of Race" earlier in 1938, a purportedly-scientific report signed by scientists and supporters of the National Fascist Party (PNF); among the 180 signers of the "Manifesto of Race" were two medical doctors (S. Visco and N. Fende), an anthropologist (L. Cipriani), a zoologist (E. Zavattari), and a statistician (F. Savorgnan). The "Manifesto of Race", published in July 1938, declared the Italians to be descendants of the Aryan race. It targeted races that were seen as inferior (i.e. not of Aryan descent). In particular, Jews were banned from many professions. Under the Racial Laws, sexual relations and marriages between Italians, Jews, and Africans were forbidden. Jews were banned from positions in banking, government, and education, as well as having their properties confiscated.

The final decision about the Racial Laws was made during the meeting of the Gran Consiglio del Fascismo, which took place on the night between 6 and 7 of October 1938 in Rome, Palazzo Venezia. Not all Italian Fascists supported discrimination: while the pro-German, anti-Jewish Roberto Farinacci and Giovanni Preziosi strongly pushed for them, Italo Balbo strongly opposed the Racial Laws. The Racial Laws prohibited Jews from most professional positions as well as prohibited sexual relations and marriages between Italians, Jews, and Africans. The press in Fascist Italy highly publicized the "Manifesto of Race", which included a mixture of biological racism and history; it declared that Italians belonged to the Aryan race, Jews were not Italians, and that it was necessary to distinguish between Europeans and non-Europeans.

While some scholars argue that this was an attempt by Mussolini to curry favour with Adolf Hitler, who increasingly became an ally of Mussolini in the late 1930s and is speculated to have pressured him to increase the racial discrimination and persecution of Jews in the Kingdom of Italy, others have argued that it reflected sentiments long entrenched not just in Fascist political philosophy but also in the teachings of the post-Tridentine Catholic Church, which remained a powerful cultural force in Mussolini's Fascist regime, representing a uniquely Italian flavour of anti-Semitism in which Jews were seen as an obstacle to the Fascist transformation of Italian society due to being bound to what Mussolini saw as decadent liberal democracies.

According to the diaries of his mistress Claretta Petacci, Mussolini boasted about being racist from the beginning, and that his racism was not because of Hitler's influence:

I was already a racist in 1921. I don't know how they can think that I imitate Hitler. They make me laugh.

Mussolini continued regarding the new anti-semitic policies:

These disgusting Jews, we must destroy them all. I will make a massacre as the Turks have done. They are carrion, enemies and cowards.

Il Tevere, an Italian Fascist newspaper founded by Mussolini and directed by Telesio Interlandi, frequently promoted anti-Semitism and railed against the alleged threat of "international Jewry". It was a frequent source of praise for Adolf Hitler's anti-Semitic policies until its disbandment after the fall of Mussolini and the Fascist regime on 25 July 1943. In the aftermath of Mussolini's fall from power, the Badoglio government suppressed the Racial Laws in the Kingdom of Italy. They remained enforced and were made more severe in the territories ruled by the Italian Social Republic (1943–1945) until the end of the Second World War.

Other groups
During a 1921 speech in Bologna, Mussolini stated that "Fascism was born... out of a profound, perennial need of this our Aryan race". Mussolini was concerned about the alleged low birth rate of the White race in contrast to the allegedly higher birth rates of the Negroid (African) and Mongoloid (Asian) races. In 1928 he talked about the alleged high birth-rate of asians and blacks in the United States, and stated that they had surpassed the population of White Americans in certain areas, such as Harlem in New York City. He described their greater racial consciousness in contrast to that of White Americans as contributing to their growing strength. On the issue of the low birth rate of White people, Mussolini said in 1928:
[When the] city dies, the nation – deprived of the young life-blood of new generations – is now made up of people who are old and degenerate and cannot defend itself against a younger people which launches an attack on the now unguarded frontiers [...] This will happen, and not just to cities and nations, but on an infinitely greater scale: the whole White race, the Western race can be submerged by other coloured races which are multiplying at a rate unknown in our race."

During the Great Depression, Mussolini again expressed his alarm about the low birth rate among Whites, saying: "The singular, enormous problem is the destiny of the white race. Europe is truly towards the end of its destiny as the leader of civilization." He went on to say that under the circumstances, "the white race is sickly", "morally and physically in ruin", and that in combination with the "progress in numbers and in expansion of yellow and black races, the civilization of the white man is destined to perish." According to Mussolini, only through promoting natality and eugenics could this be reversed. In 1933, Mussolini contradicted his earlier statements on race, saying: "Race! It is a feeling, not a reality: ninety-five percent, at least, is a feeling. Nothing will ever make me believe that biologically pure races can be shown to exist today. ... National pride has no need of the delirium of race."

During and after the Second Italo-Ethiopian War, thousands of Italian settlers flooded into Italian East Africa, prompting Mussolini to implement a variety of racist laws designed to showcase his vision of an ideal Fascist society. These were unique in their extent and comprehensiveness at attempting to enforce White supremacy even relative to other European colonies, which generally maintained much more informal systems of racial segregation. Mussolini took a vested interest in micromanaging these regulations, at one point reading a report of a non-commissioned officer playing cards with a native Eritrean and angrily telegraphing the governor of Eritrea to complain about the incident and demanding stricter enforcement of racial segregation. Enforcement of these laws was very difficult for local authorities, however, in part due to the impermanent presence of many Italians in the colony, who had no plans to stay in East Africa in the long term and only briefly resided there for financial opportunities. As such, many Italian settlers ignored these laws due to a variety of factors; some Italians saw short-term economic gain in violating laws restricting personal and commercial relations between settlers and Africans, while others simply did not share Mussolini's racism and prejudice.

References

External links 

Racism
Fascism